Felix Armin Randow is a molecular immunologist and tenured group leader at the MRC Laboratory of Molecular Biology in Cambridge. Guided by the importance of cell-autonomous immunity as the sole defender of unicellular organisms, Randow has made contributions to our understanding of host-pathogen interactions. He is an EMBO member,  a Wellcome Trust investigator and a Fellow of the Academy of Medical Sciences.

Education 
Randow grew up in Germany, where he was educated at Goetheschule in Pritzwalk and Humbold-University in Berlin. He obtained his PhD (Dr. rer. nat.) in 1997 under the guidance of Hans-Dieter Volk.

Career and Research 
Between 1997 and 2002 Randow undertook postdoctoral research in the laboratory of Brian Seed at Harvard Medical School. In 2003 he became group leader at the MRC Laboratory of Molecular Biology in Cambridge. His work revealed novel principles of cell-autonomous immunity in human tissues, namely that human cells activate anti-bacterial autophagy when sensing endomembrane damage and that cells convert cytosol-invading bacteria into anti-bacterial signalling platforms by coating the bacterial surface with specific host proteins.

Randow's work has provided important insights into the mechanism of anti-bacterial autophagy. He discovered a new pathway of cell-autonomous defence relying on galectin-8 as the receptor for membrane-damage caused by cytosol-invading bacteria., NDP52 as the first anti-bacterial autophagy receptor, and TBK1 as specifying the sites of anti-bacterial autophagy. Because the galectin-8 pathway detects membrane damage rather than the invading pathogen per se, its importance likely reaches well beyond anti-bacterial defence, including protection against viruses and tauopathies.

Randow's discovery of the E3 ubiquitin ligase LUBAC attaching M1-linked ubiquitin chains directly onto cytosol-invading bacteria, thereby activating NF-κB and autophagy, revealed another novel concept of cell-autonomous immunity, namely that cells transform bacteria into pro-inflammatory and anti-bacterial signalling platforms by coating their surface with ubiquitin. His recent demonstration of guanylate-binding proteins (GBPs) encapsulating cytosolic bacteria, thereby preventing the infection of neighbouring cells, revealed that host cells generate a distinct variety of polyvalent protein coats on cytosolic bacteria as a means to antagonize bacteria and strengthen the host defence

Awards 

 2018 Member, European Molecular Biology Organisation (EMBO)
2019 Fellow, Academy of Medical Sciences

References 

German immunologists
Year of birth missing (living people)
Living people